Polypoetes etearchus is a moth of the family Notodontidae first described by Herbert Druce in 1885. It is found in south-western Costa Rica and north-western Panama.

References

Moths described in 1885
Notodontidae